Laverty is an Irish surname that may refer to
Bernard MacLaverty (born 1942), Northern Irish writer of fiction
Colin Laverty (1937–2013), Australian medical practitioner
Conor Laverty, Irish Gaelic footballer
Eugene Laverty (born 1986), Irish motorcycle road racer
Jan Laverty Jones (born 1949), American businesswoman and politician
John Laverty (born 1982), Irish motorcycle road racer, brother of Eugene and Michael
Maura Laverty (1907–1966), Irish author, journalist and broadcaster
Michael Laverty (born 1981), Irish motorcycle road racer, brother of Eugene and John
Michael McLaverty (1904–1992), Irish writer of novels and short stories
Paul Laverty (born 1957), Scottish lawyer and scriptwriter
Peter Laverty (1926–2013), British-Australian painter, print maker, art educator and gallery director
Randy Laverty (born 1953), American politician
Shannon Laverty, Canadian stand-up comedian

See also
Lafferty

Surnames of Irish origin